Maksym Mykhaylovych Shapoval (6 July 1978 – 27 June 2017) was a senior officer (Colonel) in the Ukrainian military and head of the special forces of the Chief Intelligence Directorate.
Col. Shapoval had only recently returned from the conflict zone in eastern Ukraine, and on 27 June 2017, he was assassinated in a car bomb attack in central Kyiv. At the time of his death, Shapoval was investigating Russian involvement in Eastern Ukraine. He collected intel on their locations and weapons, which was able to substantiate Ukraine's position in the war criminal trial in The Hague on Russia's armed aggression. At the time, he was one of the most senior Ukrainian officials killed in action.

Early life 
Maksym Shapoval was born in Vyshenka district of Vinnytsia in a civilian pilot's house, and was an only child. Maksym's father, Mykhailo, commander of the AN-2 aircraft crew, worked at the Vinnytsia Airport, where he died in 1985 in his 33rd year.

Maksym Shapoval graduated from the military academy, choosing a military career like his grandfather, Leonid. His uncle also served in the armed forces in Kyiv, retiring with the rank of colonel. Shapoval joined the Kyiv Higher Engineering Radio Engineering College of Air Defense, and in 1999 became a member of the newly established Military Institute of NTUU "KPI", the Faculty of Encryptors, and graduated in 2000.

Military career 

Shapoval began his military service as an officer in the Encrypted Communications and Security Mode of the Defense Intelligence of the Ministry of Defense of Ukraine. He also participated in a peacekeeping mission in Sierra Leone. Upon his return he served as a senior officer, commander of a group of scuba divers. In 2010–2012, he served in the Department of State Protection for the Protection of the First Person of the State. After UDO, he returned to his position as Chief of the Instructor Service and was subsequently appointed Deputy Commander of the Military Unit then made the Commander of the Military Unit.

Involvement in the War of Donbas 
Col. Shapoval served 3 years leading special operations forces in combat missions in Eastern Ukraine, as commander of the 10th Special Detachment of the Main Directorate of Intelligence of the Ministry of Defense of Ukraine. The "ten" unit has the unofficial name of "Island", based on Rybalsky Island. Shapoval was the commander of a special appointment group, which in May 2014 retook Donetsk airport from pro-Russian separatists.

He was directly involved in the planning and conducting of reconnaissance raids into the enemy's deep rear, using the means of documenting the presence of Russian occupying troops, their movements, the availability of up-to-date models of EW systems and means of destruction. Including in such a way that it could serve as an absolute proof of Russia's armed aggression against Ukraine, especially in the use of full-fledged BTRGs and the latest defeat systems, which are produced only in Russia. Some intelligence operations concerned timely notification of the deployment of Russian artillery, including long-range artillery, which significantly reduced casualties among Ukrainian military and civilians. Shapoval also served as a frontline special forces commander early on in the Siege of Sloviansk in which the pro-Russian insurgents were eventually pushed out of the city of Sloviansk after nearly three months of fighting in July 2014.

According to Ukrainian intelligence, on 7 June 2017, Shapoval's unit liquidated one senior officer, Colonel Cherkashin Yuri Mikhailovich of the FSB special forces unit Vympel in the occupied territory of Donbas who was responsible for organising "terrorists acts" on Ukraine.

Assassination 
On 27 June 2017, Colonel Maksym Shapoval was assassinated in a car bomb attack in central Kyiv. At 8:16 (UTC) the Mercedes Benz vehicle he was driving exploded in a detonation from a bomb planted underneath the vehicle, killing him instantly and wounding two bystanders: a female passerby with shrapnel wounds to her leg and a 71-year-old man with wounds to his neck. Kyiv police have branded the incident a "terrorist attack"; Russian intelligence is suspected to be behind the car bomb.

On the same day a similar car bomb explosion in Kostiantynivka, Donetsk Oblast killed another colonel and wounded three more officers of the Security Service of Ukraine. Colonel Yuri Vozny, head of the counterintelligence department, was killed as a result. Russian intelligence was also blamed for the attack.

A short time after the assassination, a cyberattack was launched. Former government adviser in Georgia and Moldova Molly K. McKew believed Shapoval's assassination was related with this cyberattack. She also stated that Shapoval was a "huge asset" to Ukraine's security.

Shapoval is survived by his wife, Iryna, a five-year-old daughter and a two-year-old son at the time of his death.

Investigation and aftermath 
On 17 April 2019, Head of SBU  Vasyl Hrytsak announced the name of the saboteur who laid the blast; Oleg Shutov, who was a resident of Donetsk, an employee of the so-called "DPR Ministry of Civil Defense" Special Operations Center. Shutov rented an apartment in the same house where Shapoval lived. After the attack, he left for Donetsk.

Ukraine held the chief of the counter-intelligence operations department of the FSB of the Russian Federation Lieutenant-General Dmitry Minaev, personally responsible for ordering the assassinations of both Col. Shapoval and another special service operative Col. Oleksandr Kharaberyush of the SBU back on 31 March 2017. He was present at the time in the Donbas in the so-called center of special operations of the "DPR Ministry of Civil Defense" during the explosions of Kharaberyush and Shapoval's cars.

Awards 
 Promoted to the rank of Major general posthumously on 30 June 2017.
 Awarded posthumously with the “Golden Star” Order of Hero of Ukraine on 7 September 2017.

See also 
 Pavel Sheremet
 Denis Voronenkov
 List of unsolved murders

References

External links

Defence Intelligence of Ukraine

1978 births
2017 deaths
Assassinated Ukrainian people
Deaths by car bomb
Male murder victims
Military personnel  from Vinnytsia
People murdered in Ukraine
Recipients of the Order of Gold Star (Ukraine)
Ukrainian colonels
Ukrainian military personnel of the war in Donbas
Ukrainian military personnel killed in the Russo-Ukrainian War
Unsolved murders in Ukraine
2017 murders in Ukraine